Vice president of Ethiopia was a political position in Ethiopia during the era of the People's Democratic Republic of Ethiopia. The new constitution which established the presidency and vice presidency came to effect on 10 Sept 1987. Both the President and Vice President were elected by the legislature. The position became obsolete in 1995 with the adoption of the 1995 constitution.

During Derg 1974–1987

During People's Democratic Republic of Ethiopia 1987–1991

References

Politics of Ethiopia
Government of Ethiopia
Vice presidents of Ethiopia
Ethiopia
1987 establishments in Ethiopia